

319001–319100 

|-id=009
| 319009 Kudirka ||  || Vincas Kudirka (1858–1899) trained as a physician but is best known as a Lithuanian poet. He is regarded in Lithuania as a National Hero and he wrote both the music and lyrics of the Lithuanian National Anthem, Tautiska giesme. || 
|}

319101–319200 

|-bgcolor=#f2f2f2
| colspan=4 align=center | 
|}

319201–319300 

|-id=227
| 319227 Erichbär ||  || Erich Bär (1905–1981), a German electrical engineer and amateur astronomer. || 
|}

319301–319400 

|-bgcolor=#f2f2f2
| colspan=4 align=center | 
|}

319401–319500 

|-bgcolor=#f2f2f2
| colspan=4 align=center | 
|}

319501–319600 

|-bgcolor=#f2f2f2
| colspan=4 align=center | 
|}

319601–319700 

|-bgcolor=#f2f2f2
| colspan=4 align=center | 
|}

319701–319800 

|-bgcolor=#f2f2f2
| colspan=4 align=center | 
|}

319801–319900 

|-bgcolor=#f2f2f2
| colspan=4 align=center | 
|}

319901–320000 

|-bgcolor=#f2f2f2
| colspan=4 align=center | 
|}

References 

319001-320000